is the name of the town center of Iwamura in Ena,  Gifu Prefecture, and was designated as one of the Important Preservation Districts for Groups of Traditional Buildings on April 17, 1998. It is the merchant district of a former castle town that prospered during the Edo period as a political, cultural and economic center of the Tōnō region.

Overview 
 The  (illegitimately descended from the Matsudaira clan), who ruled Iwamura Castle in the first part of the Edo period, created the model for the townscape. It prospered as the castle town of the 30,000 koku Iwamura Domain.
In the present day, most of  the Edo period buildings have been remodeled. However, many of them have original features preserved such as the shorter second floor, . The building plots are long and stretch from north to south. Common features are gables and gabled roofs, latticework, and tiled roofs. Some have Namako walls and others have , lit. 'warrior windows'. Houses from each period from the first part of the Edo period through to the present day line the street.
These houses were built with the living room on the second floor and tall eaves.

Highlights 

Kimura Estate
Kachigawa House
Shibata House (Iwamura Art Gallery)
Tosa-ya (Crafts Gallery)
: Sake brewery founded in the Edo period.

Access 

 10 minutes' walk from Iwamura Station on the Akechi Line

See also 

 Hanbun, Aoi

References

External links 

 Iwamura Tourism Association
 Hot Iwamura
 Old Townscapes

Ena, Gifu
Tourist attractions in Gifu Prefecture